Abby Cubillo (born 18 May 1999) is an Australian professional basketball player. She plays for the University of Canberra Capitals in the Women's National Basketball League (WNBL). She is a national champion and a world champion, and the first player born and raised in the Northern Territory to play in the WNBL.

Biography 
Abby Lorna Cubillo was born in Darwin on 18 May 1999. She is of Aboriginal Australian descent through her father, one of the Larrakia, the traditional owners of the Darwin region. She left Darwin and moved to Sydney, where she boarded at Barker College, and won a Gold medal at the Pacific School Games.

In November 2015, Cubillo was awarded one of eight places in the Centre of Excellence program at the Australian Institute of Sport (AIS) in Canberra. She became the second Northern Territorian to be awarded an AIS basketball scholarship, the first being Toni Gabelish, who was there in 1990 and 1991, and who also played for the Tracey Village Jets in the Northern Territory. In Canberra she studied at the University of Canberra Senior Secondary College Lake Ginninderra.

Cubillo  spent two years at the AIS, where she played for the Capitals Academy in the South East Australian Basketball League (SEABL), and continued her studies at the University of Canberra. She was starting point guard for the Australia women's national under-17 basketball team (Sapphires) at the 2016 FIBA Under-17 World Championship for Women in Spain in July 2016, where the Sapphires won gold. In September, she was selected as part of the Australia women's national under-19 basketball team (Gems) squad for the 2017 FIBA Under-19 Women's Basketball World Cup in Italy.

Cubillo  made her Women's National Basketball League (WNBL) debut with the University of Canberra Capitals during their game against the Sydney University Flames at Brydens Stadium on 12 October 2018. She became the first player born and raised in the Northern Territory to play in the WNBL. The Capitals won 97–78; although on the court for only 2 minutes and 42 seconds, she took a rebound and was credited with an assist. For the WNBL indigenous round in December 2018, she unveiled indigenous-themed uniforms that the Capitals wore in their game against Perth Lynx. The Capitals went on to win the WNBL finals, and while Cubillo did not take to the court during the three-game final series, as part of the team she became a national champion.

References

1999 births
Living people
Australian women's basketball players
Canberra Capitals players
Guards (basketball)
Indigenous Australian basketball players
People educated at Lake Ginninderra College
Sportspeople from Darwin, Northern Territory